Ecphorella wellmani is a species of ant and the only known species of genus Ecphorella. The species is only known from workers from the type locality in Benguela, Angola. Nothing is known about their biology.

References

External links

Endemic fauna of Angola
Dolichoderinae
Monotypic ant genera
Hymenoptera of Africa
Insects of Angola